Coarazuphium is a genus of beetles in the family Carabidae.

Species 
Coarazuphium contains the following species:
 Coarazuphium amazonicum Pellegrini & Ferreira, 2017
 Coarazuphium auleri Pellegrini & Vieira, 2021
 Coarazuphium bezerra Gnaspini, Vanin & Godoy, 1998
 Coarazuphium caatinga Pellegrini & Ferreira, 2014
 Coarazuphium cessaima Gnaspini, Vanin & Godoy, 1998
 Coarazuphium formoso Pellegrini & Ferreira, 2011
 Coarazuphium kayapo Pellegrini, Ferreira & Vieira, 2022
 Coarazuphium pains Álvares & Ferreira, 2002
 Coarazuphium ricardoi Cassia Bená & Vanin, 2014
 Coarazuphium spinifemur Pellegrini & Ferreira, 2017
 Coarazuphium tapiaguassu Pellegrini & Ferreira, 2011
 Coarazuphium tessai (Godoy & Vanin, 1990)
 Coarazuphium whiteheadi Ball & Shpeley, 2013
 Coarazuphium xikrin Pellegrini, Ferreira & Vieira, 2022
 Coarazuphium xingu Pellegrini, Ferreira & Vieira, 2022

References

Dryptinae